Marcello Falzerano (born 12 April 1991) is an Italian footballer who plays as a winger or midfielder for  club Ascoli.

Career

Youth career
Born in Pagani, the province of Salerno, Campania, Falzerano started his career at Rome club G.S. Edipro Roma. He was selected to Lazio regional Giovanissimi representative team in April 2006. In mid-2006 Falzerano left for Savio. The two Allievi teams of the club finished as the runner-up of Lazio region Allievi league and losing semi-finalists of Lazio Allievi Fascia B respectively. Falzerano mainly played for the latter, losing to S.S. Lazio.  At the end of season he was selected to the Lazio Allievi representatives, to 2007 Coppa Nazionale Primavera, an event competed by the representatives of Italian regions.

Salernitana
On 1 September 2008 Falzerano joined Serie B team Salernitana, located in Salerno. After the team relegated in 2009–10 Serie B, Falzerano made his first team debut. He was selected to 2011 Lega Pro Quadrangular Tournament for Italy U20 Serie C team, losing to Lega Pro Second Division/B 0–2.

Chievo and co-ownership
Salernitana bankrupted in summer 2011. Falzerano was signed by Serie A club A.C. ChievoVerona, and sold to Avellino in co-ownership deal. Falzerano spent 5 months with the Campania team. On 24 January 2012 Falzerano was signed by Latina, returning to Lazio region after  seasons. He played 11 games for the club in the league as well as in relegation "play-out". Latina beat Triestina in the playoffs and secured a place in the third division for the next season .

Right before joined Latina, Falzerano also selected to the prima divisione Group A under-21 representative team, for 2012 Lega Pro Quadrangular Tournament. Prima Divisione Group A team won that tournament.

On 21 June 2012 Chievo bought back Falzerano. In July 2012 Falzerano left for Serie B club U.S. Grosseto F.C. and Chievo bought back Falzerano again on 20 June 2013.

Lega Pro return
Falzerano was released during the summer transfer windows. On 10 September 2013 he signed a 1-year contract with Ascoli. On 9 January 2014 he was signed by Gubbio.

After a good season with Pistoiese, he joined Bassano.

Venezia
On 31 January 2017, Bassano sold him to Venezia outright.

Perugia
On 10 January 2019, Falzerano joined Perugia.

Return to Ascoli
On 26 July 2022, Falzerano returned to Ascoli.

References

External links
 Football.it Profile 
 

1991 births
Sportspeople from the Province of Salerno
Living people
Italian footballers
Association football wingers
U.S. Salernitana 1919 players
U.S. Avellino 1912 players
Latina Calcio 1932 players
F.C. Grosseto S.S.D. players
Ascoli Calcio 1898 F.C. players
A.S. Gubbio 1910 players
U.S. Pistoiese 1921 players
Bassano Virtus 55 S.T. players
Venezia F.C. players
A.C. Perugia Calcio players
Serie B players
Serie C players
Footballers from Campania